The 7th BRICS summit was the seventh annual diplomatic summit of the head of states or government of the BRICS member states. It was held in the Russian city of Ufa in Bashkortostan on 8–9 July 2015.

Background

During the 6th BRICS summit in Fortaleza, Brazil, the BRICS leaders signed a declaration reading: "Brazil, India, China and South Africa convey their appreciation to Russia for its offer to host the Seventh BRICS Summit in 2015 in the city of Ufa and extend their full support to that end."

Agenda
The summit coincided with the entry into force of constituting agreements of the New Development Bank and the BRICS Contingent Reserve Arrangement and during the summit inaugural meetings of the NDB were held, and it was announced it would be lending in local currency; and open up membership to non-BRICS countries in the coming months.

Participants

BRICS-SCO-EEU summit
The BRICS held a joint summit with the Shanghai Cooperation Organisation and the Eurasian Economic Union in Ufa on 9 July. 
Invited heads of states or government:

 – Ashraf Ghani
 – Serzh Sargsyan
 – Alexander Lukashenko
 – Hassan Rouhani
 – Nursultan Nazarbaev
 – Almazbek Atambayev
 – Tsakhiagiin Elbegdorj
 – Nawaz Sharif
 – Emomali Rahmon
 – Islam Karimov

Leaders

Gallery

References

External links

Official website of 7th BRICS Summit

07
2015 conferences
2015 in international relations
2015 in Russia
21st-century diplomatic conferences (BRICS)
Diplomatic conferences in Russia
History of Bashkortostan
History of Ufa
July 2015 events in Russia